During the 1990–91 English football season, Crystal Palace F.C. competed in the Football League First Division.

Season summary
In their second consecutive season in the First Division, Crystal Palace finished an astonishing third, their highest ever league placing, although, due to Liverpool's ban from European competition being lifted, Palace did not qualify for the UEFA Cup. Palace also won their first ever cup during the season, albeit the less significant Full Members' Cup.

In the League Cup, Palace broke their record for a cup victory with an 8–0 over Southend United, in the second round first leg, with strikers Mark Bright and Ian Wright both scoring hat-tricks. The two claimed the match ball; it was given away at a charity auction.

At the end of the season, captain Geoff Thomas was named the Supporters' Player of the Year. Thomas was rewarded for his good form with a call-up to the England squad for a European Championship qualifying game against Turkey in May.

Bukta remained Palace's kit manufacturers, and introduced a new home kit for the season. English airline Virgin Atlantic remained the kit sponsors.

Final league table

Results summary

Results by round

Results
Crystal Palace's score comes first

Legend

Football League First Division

FA Cup

League Cup

Full Members' Cup

Squad

Left club during season

Transfers

In

Out

Transfers in:  £2,321,000
Transfers out:  £850,000
Total spending:  £1,471,000

References

Crystal Palace F.C. seasons
Crystal Palace